Manuel Mesías Enríquez Rosero (born 24 December 1958) is a Senator of Colombia. A lawyer and Party of the U politician, he has served in the Congress of Colombia since 2002, first as a Member of the Chamber of Representatives and then as a Senator since 2006, having been replaced temporarily by Julio César Bastidas Castillo in 2004.

References

1958 births
Living people
People from Nariño Department
20th-century Colombian lawyers
Free University of Colombia alumni
Members of the Senate of Colombia
Social Party of National Unity politicians